Rischbieth is a surname, in Germany pronounced something like "rishbeet", but many Australian descendants use "rishbeeth".

People who share this name include:
Bessie Rischbieth (1874–1967), Australian feminist and social activist
Charles Rischbieth (1835–1893), South Australian businessman, born in Germany
Henry Wills Rischbieth (1869–1925), Australian grazier and wool merchant
Nick Rischbieth, bass guitarist with the Sacred Cowboys
Oswald Rishbeth (1886–1946), geographer, born Rischbieth

Other uses
Charles Rischbieth Jury (1893–1958), poet and academic, born in South Australia